The Peace River was a sternwheel steamship that provided transportation on the river of the same name.
The Peace River had navigational difficulties.

She was launched in 1905, and she usually managed three round trips per year.

References

External links
 

Paddle steamers of Canada
1905 ships